La dama boba is a commedia lirica  by Ermanno Wolf-Ferrari in 3 acts to a libretto by Mario Ghisalberti, after Lope de Vega's 1613 play of the same title. It was premiered 1 February 1939 at La Scala, Milan under :it:Umberto Berrettoni, with Mafalda Favero in the lead role.

References

Operas by Ermanno Wolf-Ferrari
Italian-language operas
1939 operas
Operas
Operas based on plays